P&S Metalltechnik is a German UCI Continental cycling team founded in 2017 as an amateur team, before upgrading to Continental in 2019.

Team roster

Major wins
2019
Puchar Uzdrowisk Karpackich, John Mandrysch
2020
Stage 2 Course de Solidarność et des Champions Olympiques, Michel Aschenbrenner
2021
 Overall In the footsteps of the Romans, Immanuel Stark
 Young rider classification, Michel Aschenbrenner
Stage 1, Immanuel Stark

References

External links

UCI Continental Teams (Europe)
Cycling teams based in Germany
Cycling teams established in 2017